Westwood is an urban-suburban neighborhood of Cincinnati, Ohio. It is located north of Price Hill, west of Fairmount, and southwest of Mount Airy.

Demographics
Westwood is Cincinnati's largest neighborhood. The population was 36,064 as of the 2020 Census.

History
Westwood was incorporated as a village on 14 September 1868. It was annexed by the City of Cincinnati on 8 May 1896.

In the late 19th and early 20th centuries, Westwood's rural environment attracted many wealthy individuals, such as Procter & Gamble co-founder James Gamble. The neighborhood declined economically following World War II as poorer individuals moved into Westwood and many wealthy whites moved to Cincinnati's outer suburbs. 

On December 15, 2021, the Cincinnati City Council approved a proposal to create a "designated outdoor refreshment area" (DORA), an area in which outdoor possession of open alcohol containers is legal, in Westwood. If implemented, the Westwood DORA will be the city's second such area out of a legal maximum of four.

Geography and architecture

Westwood's main thoroughfares (specifically Harrison Avenue and Boudinot Avenue) feature many uniquely large and decorative houses, while surrounding streets include a mixture of apartment homes and housing, as constructed by the large number of German immigrants who settled in the Cincinnati vicinity.  The area's growth continued steadily for many decades, becoming a residential haven for many of Cincinnati's blue-collar workers, and leading to additional development in the surrounding neighborhoods. Adjacent to Westwood is the city of Cheviot, Ohio another one of the oldest suburban communities in Hamilton County. Even longtime residents have a difficult time determining where Cheviot ends and Westwood begins, or vice versa.

Bracken Woods is an urban park in Westwood containing a nature preserve.

Westwood contains the Westwood Town Center Historic District.

Schools
Westwood is served by Cincinnati Public Schools, as well as some parochial institutions. Schools located in the neighborhood include:
 Dater Montessori (preschool-6)
 Gamble Montessori Elementary School (preschool-6)
 Gamble Montessori High School (7-12)
 Midway Elementary School (preschool-6)
 Westwood Elementary School (preschool-6)
 Our Lady of Lourdes Elementary School
 St. Catharine of Siena Elementary School

A variety of schools in nearby Price Hill also serve students in Westwood, such as;

 Gilbert A. Dater High School (7-12)
 Elder High School (7-12)
 Seton High School (7-12)
 Western Hills High School (7-12)

People

 Steve Chabot, U.S. Congressman (1995-2009, 2011-2022)
 James Gamble, Industrialist
 James Michael Lafferty, US Business Leader and Olympic Track and Field coach.

References

Further reading
 A History of Westwood: community, continuity and change by Lyle Koehler (1944-), professional historian on staff at University of Cincinnati. Commissioned, published and sponsored by Westwood Civic Association, 1981. Noncirculating copy (one of 2) at Public Library of Cincinnati and Hamilton County, Westwood Branch, attn. Kathy Bach, branch manager and neighborhood historian. To be digitized by PLC&HC (2009).

External links
Westwood Civic Association

 
Neighborhoods in Cincinnati
Former municipalities in Ohio